was a Japanese rock band. They signed with the record label Sony Music Entertainment Japan. The group had two members, Daigo Fujita (vocals and guitar) and Honoka Satō (violin).

As of December 17, 2010, alüto has disbanded. They released one indie album and one major album. The single Michi (道) ~ To You All was featured in Naruto: Shippuden as the second ending.

Discography

Singles

Michi (道) ~ To You All ( naruto OST )
Kaze To Tada Mae Wo Mita 
Haribote Tsumiki 
Michi - Violin version ("Way") 
愛に手ふれて - Ai ni te furete ("wave goodbye to love") 
粉雪舞って - kona yuki matte 
カフェモヨウ - kahue moyou 
もっと - Motto 
愛に手ふれて - ai ni te furete (Violin version) 
Mirai Kuusou (fantasy of the future)
Utautai No Ballad 
Kanashiki taion 
Kimi no koe ("Your voice") 
Hatsukoi warutsu  (First Love's Waltz)
Letter

Japanese rock music groups